Mimaletis postica is a moth in the family of Geometridae first described by Francis Walker in 1869.

This species is known from Equatorial Guinea and the Democratic Republic of the Congo.

References

Ennominae
Moths described in 1869